Sam E. Rork (1870 – July 24, 1933) was an American silent film producer.

Early life
Sam Edwin Rork was born in 1870 in Albany, New York.

Career
He started his career at Wallack's Theatre in New York City.

He moved to Los Angeles, California with Mack Sennett, for whose company, Mack Sennett Enterprises, he worked. He later worked as a producer for First National. He then set up his own film producer company, Sam E. Rork Productions, and produced eight films.

He produced Clothes Make the Pirate in 1925. A year later, in 1926, he produced Old Loves and New and The Blonde Saint. In 1927, he produced The Notorious Lady, A Texas Steer, and The Prince of Headwaiters. In 1932, he was the associate producer of Call Her Savage.

Personal life
He married Helen Welch. They had a daughter, Ann Rork, a silent actress.

Death
He died on July 24, 1933, in Hollywood, California.

References

External links

1870 births
1933 deaths
Businesspeople from Albany, New York
Businesspeople from Los Angeles
Film producers from California
Film producers from New York (state)